Andhaa Kaanoon is a 1983 Hindi-language action film directed by T. Rama Rao, starring Rajinikanth, Hema Malini, Reena Roy in leading roles and featuring an ensemble cast of villains in supporting roles including Prem Chopra, Danny Denzongpa, Pran, Madan Puri & Amrish Puri. Amitabh Bachchan makes an extended special appearance along with Madhavi & Dharmendra is seen in a cameo. It is a remake of the Tamil film Sattam Oru Iruttarai (1981).

Plot 
Vijay Singh (Rajinikanth) is hell bent on taking vengeance against three men who had traumatized and killed some of his family members. Vijay's sister, Durga Devi Singh (Hema Malini), has joined the Police department just to take revenge against those three men through lawful means. Vijay has decided to kill them one by one by taking law into his own hands as he does not believe in the law.

One day Vijay comes across  an angry and embittered Jaan Nisar Khan (Amitabh Bachchan) who has just been released from prison. Khan used to work as a Forest Officer, and lived with his wife Zakhiya (Madhavi) and daughter Neelu. One day while on duty he had come across some poachers who were cutting sandal wood trees illegally. When challenged, they had retaliated. A struggle ensued and one of them, Ram Gupta (Amrish Puri), was killed. Khan was charged with murder, tried in court, and sentenced to 20 years in prison. His shocked and devastated wife, was raped and she had killed herself and their daughter.

Khan now decides to help Vijay. And then Khan finds out that Gupta is still alive. How the three protagonists, Khan, Durga and Vijay, succeed in avenging the enemies forms the rest of the story.

Cast 

 Hema Malini as Inspector Durga Devi Singh
 Rajinikanth as Vijay Kumar Singh
 Reena Roy as Meena Shrivatsav
 Amitabh Bachchan as Jaan Nisar Khan (Special Appearance)
 Madhavi as Zakhiya Khan (Special Appearance)
 Prem Chopra as Amarnath
 Danny Denzongpa as Akbar Ali
 Pran as Anthony D'Cruz
 Madan Puri as Jailor Gupta
 Amrish Puri as Ram Gupta
 Om Shivpuri as Police Commissioner K. B. Lal
 Sulochana Latkar as Mrs. Singh 
 Urmila Bhatt as Mrs. Shrivastav
 Asrani as Constable Asrani
 Agha as Police Constable
 Harish Kumar as Young Vijay Kumar Singh
 Dharmendra as Truck Driver (Cameo)

Soundtrack 
All lyrics written by Anand Bakshi and music by Laxmikant-Pyarelal.

References

Bibliography

External links 
 

1980s action drama films
1980s Hindi-language films
1980s vigilante films
1983 drama films
1983 films
Films directed by T. Rama Rao
Films scored by Laxmikant–Pyarelal
Hindi remakes of Tamil films
Indian action drama films
Indian films about revenge
Indian vigilante films